Princeton-by-the-Sea (sometimes, especially locally, called Princeton) is an unincorporated community on the coast of San Mateo County, California. The ZIP code is 94019 and the community is in area code 650.

Profile
This area was inhabited by Ohlone tribes in pre-Columbian times. According to mission records, the Chiguan Ohlones, who numbered about 50, called the place Ssatumnumo, and had a second village, Chagunte, near Half Moon Bay.

Because of the special microhabitat of the adjacent Pillar Point Harbor, there are numerous pelagic birds that visit the local area.  The area has a boating cachet for harbor activities and has been a tourist destination since the early 1900s with the establishment of the Princeton Inn Hotel. As of 2000, the population of the community is 297.

Besides the harbor, with its piers and docks, Princeton has a number of shops, restaurants, and accommodations.  The community is near State Route 1, the Cabrillo Highway, just north of Half Moon Bay and south of Moss Beach.  The Half Moon Bay Airport is just north of the community.

The annual surfing competition Mavericks actually takes place in Princeton, although it is usually attributed to neighboring Half Moon Bay.

Addresses within Princeton-by-the-Sea are often listed as Half Moon Bay addresses.

Geography
This community is located on level ground at an elevation of five feet (1.5 m) above mean sea datum (U.S. Geological Survey, 1980).  The soil in the Princeton-by-the-Sea vicinity has good drainage, since the surface consists of marine deposits with underlying water bearing sediments of unconsolidated sand and gravel deposits (Earth Metrics, 1989).  Until 1973 extensive row crop farming was conducted immediately at the northern edge of Princeton.

See also
 Half Moon Bay Airport

References 

 U.S. Geological Survey, Montara Mountain, California, 7.5 Minute Quadrangle, 1956, photorevised 1980.
 Earth Metrics Inc, Phase 1 Environmental Site Assessment, Shorebird Restaurant, 390 Capistrano Road, Princeton-by-the-Sea, Report # 10310, Nov. 10, 1989

Unincorporated communities in San Mateo County, California
Half Moon Bay, California
Former Native American populated places in California
Unincorporated communities in California